The Underwater Archaeology Branch (UAB) of the Naval History & Heritage Command (NHHC) is a unit of the United States Department of the Navy.  It was formally founded in 1996 as a consequence of the emerging need to manage, study, conserve, and curate the U.S. Navy's submerged cultural resources.

History and  mission

The Branch acts as the center of expertise and recognized authority for the Department of the Navy in all matters related to the science of underwater archaeology and the identification, research, analysis, interpretation, preservation, conservation, inventory, and management of Navy's historic shipwrecks and aircraft wrecks and their associated contents.

The Branch preserves, protects, and makes access available to sunken military craft and their associated contents which act as a permanent reminder of the Navy's naval engagements, technological advancements, and maritime heritage.

Duties and responsibilities

Underwater archaeological expertise

UAB advises the NHHC on all matters concerning underwater archaeology, preservation and management of United States Navy wrecks. UAB also provides expertise on sunken Navy military craft to other Navy Commands, the Department of Defense, other Federal Agencies, state and local governments, non-profit organizations, universities, and the media.

Archaeological research

UAB conducts scientific research in the form of archaeological surveys, site assessments, and excavations. UAB also oversees, supports, and issues archaeological permits to third-party researchers. Finally, the Branch seeks to encourage research and development in related science and technology fields which in turn contribute to Navy project-based training.

Conservation and curation of artifacts
UAB operates a state-of-the-art Archaeology & Conservation Laboratory as well as provides professional guidance to the Navy on conservation and curation of artifacts originating from an underwater environment. The branch inventories, conserves, curates, and provides access to an artifact collection of over 2000 artifacts for research, analysis, and museum exhibition. It also maintains an archaeological artifact loan program with over 7200 artifacts currently on loan to national and international museums.

The UAB Laboratory also functions as an environmentally-controlled curatorial repository for Navy's recovered artifacts that are not on loan to museums or other institutions. After removal from an underwater environment, the artifacts are in immediate danger due to the deteriorating effects of increased oxygen, temperature, light, and other atmospheric conditions. While artifacts are undergoing conservation in the laboratory, they are scientifically analyzed and thoroughly documented to prevent loss of information throughout the stabilization process. Even after they are stabilized, artifacts excavated from underwater sites require periodic monitoring and evaluation, as they are susceptible to fluctuations in their immediate environment. All collections are available for study, with research as its goal.

Historic preservation and policy development

The Branch develops, coordinates, reviews, advises, and implements policy related to the preservation and protection of Navy sunken military craft and Ensures Navy compliance with applicable federal laws. To this effect, it drafts cooperative agreements, state or regional management plans, legislation, regulations, and assists the Department of State and Department of Justice in international agreements and litigation claims involving both domestic and foreign sunken military craft.

Under the Sunken Military Craft Act, the United States maintains ownership of any sunken military craft and its associated contents owned or operated by the government at the time of its sinking, regardless of the passage of time or location. As a result, it is illegal to disturb, remove, or injure sunken military craft, including navy wrecks, as well as foreign government historic wrecks located in U.S. waters, without permission.

As part of its management mandate, UAB also coordinates the protection of Navy sunken military craft as, besides their historical importance, many of them serve as war graves, carry unexploded ordnance, or may potentially raise environmental concerns.

In addition to policy and laws, the UAB maintains a geographic information system and database of over 3,000 ship and 14,000 aircraft wrecks for management as well as prepares nominations for the National Register of Historic Places.

Outreach efforts and dissemination of information

The UAB disseminates information to the Navy, the general public, and academia on Navy archaeology, conservation, history, and historic preservation policy via scientific and popular publications, lectures, the NHHC UAB web-site, in-person tours of the Archaeology & Conservation Laboratory, the artifact loan program, and underwater archaeological exhibits. The UAB also strives to support United States Naval Academy midshipmen training and student research.

Vision

The Underwater Archaeology Branch, as the Department of the Navy's sole expertise on underwater cultural heritage, envisions the Navy's sunken ship and aircraft as a unique resource for interpreting the Navy's history and traditions through the science of underwater archaeology. The Navy's sunken military craft represent a non-renewable, fragile, and untapped repository for science, technology, and history.

The Branch operates at the interface between policy, archaeology, history, cultural resource management, and marine science. As such, it is highly dependent upon multi-disciplinary cooperative relationships with federal, state and private programs, advances in technologies, and a variety of scientific disciplines.

Priorities

The Underwater Archaeology Branch intends to augment and maintain its reputation as the Navy's center of expertise in all matters pertaining to underwater archaeology, conservation, historic preservation policy, and sunken military craft management.
Identify priority targets, conduct archaeological research, and produce educational products and publications on the Navy's historic wrecks.
Maintain a state-of-the-art conservation and curation laboratory.
Build cooperative relationships with other Navy Commands, federal agencies, academic institutions and private sector with the aim of preserving Navy's cultural heritage.
Educate the Navy and the public on the importance of preserving the Navy's underwater archaeological cultural heritage for present and future generations.
Fulfill the legal mandate regarding the management and preservation of the Navy's historic ship and aircraft wrecks.

Projects

German submarine U-1105
Boca Chica Channel Wreck
Penobscot Expedition
Remote-sensing survey of D-Day Landing sites
Search for

References

External links
Underwater Archaeology Branch
Sunken Military Craft Act
Clemson Conservation Center
 Naval History & Heritage Command
Naval History Blog - Underwater Archaeology

Underwater archaeology
Naval History and Heritage Command
Agencies of the United States government
Organizations established in 1996
Organizations based in Washington, D.C.
United States Navy organization